The descort was a form and genre of Old Occitan lyric poetry used by troubadours. It was heavily discordant in verse form and/or feeling and often used to express disagreement. It was possibly invented by Garin d'Apchier when he wrote Quan foill'e flors reverdezis (only the first two lines survive); the invention is credited to him by a vida, and these are unreliable. Gautier de Dargies imported the descort into Old French and wrote and composed three.

Unlike the canso, the most common open poetic form of the troubadours and the template upon which most genres were built, the descort is made of stanzas with a variable number of lines, and of lines with a variable number of syllables. Whereas the different stanzas of a canso usually share at least some of the rhymes, the rhymes of a descort are usually used within a single stanza and then discarded. Raimbaut de Vaqueiras brings this to the extreme by actually using different languages in each stanza. This made the descort a more challenging piece to write, as its irregular nature forced the troubadour to always write a new melody.

List of descorts

References

Occitan literary genres
Western medieval lyric forms
Old Occitan literature